Roger Forster may refer to:

 Roger T. Forster (born 1933), theologian and leader of Ichthus Christian Fellowship
 Roger Forster (actor), see The Rules of the Game
Roger Forster (MP) for Lewes 1406-1407